The men's épée was one of seven fencing events on the fencing at the 1948 Summer Olympics programme. It was the tenth appearance of the event. The competition was held from 7 August 1948 to 9 August 1948. 66 fencers from 25 nations competed. The event was won by Luigi Cantone of Italy, the nation's third consecutive victory in the men's épée (matching France for most all-time). Italy also earned its third consecutive bronze medal in the event, with Edoardo Mangiarotti's third-place finish. Between the two Italians was Oswald Zappelli of Switzerland, taking the silver medal.

Background

This was the 10th appearance of the event, which was not held at the first Games in 1896 (with only foil and sabre events held) but has been held at every Summer Olympics since 1900.

One of the 10 finalists from the pre-war 1936 Games returned: fifth-place finisher Charles Debeur of Belgium. The reigning (1947) World Champion, Édouard Artigas of France, competed in the team event but not the individual event.

Colombia and Luxembourg each made their debut in the event. Belgium and the United States each appeared for the ninth time, tied for most among nations.

Competition format

The competition format was pool play round-robin, with bouts to three touches. Not all bouts were played in some pools if not necessary to determine advancement. Ties were broken through fence-off bouts ("barrages") in early rounds if necessary for determining advancement, but by touches received in final rounds (and for non-advancement-necessary placing in earlier rounds). A barrage was held for the silver and bronze medals when the two fencers finished event on record, touches received, and touches scored.

The 1948 competition introduced byes for team event finalists.

 Round 1: 8 pools of between 5 and 8 fencers each. The top 4 fencers in each pool advanced to the quarterfinals.
 Quarterfinals: 6 pools between 6 and 7 fencers each. The top 3 fencers in each pool advanced to the semifinals. 
 Semifinals: 2 pools of 9 fencers each. The top 5 fencers in each pool advanced to the final.
 Final: 1 pool of 10 fencers.

Schedule

All times are British Summer Time (UTC+1)

Results

Round 1

The top 4 finishers in each pool advanced to round 2. Fencers from the four teams that advanced to the final of the men's team épée event received byes through round 1:
 Denmark: Mogens Lüchow and Ib Nielsen
 France: Marcel Desprets, Henri Guérin, and Henri Lepage
 Italy: Carlo Agostoni, Luigi Cantone, and Edoardo Mangiarotti
 Sweden: Frank Cervell, Carl Forssell, and Bengt Ljungquist

Pool 1

Pool 2

Biancalana defeated Mørch and Wolff in a three-way barrage for fourth place.

Pool 3

Simonetti defeated Meraz and Pouliot in a three-way barrage for fourth place.

Pool 4

Radoux defeated de Barros and Nawrocki in a three-way barrage for fourth place.

Pool 5

Pool 6

Pool 7

Younes defeated Iturri in a barrage for fourth place.

Pool 8

Younes defeated Iturri in a barrage for fourth place.

Quarterfinals

The top 3 finishers in each pool advanced to the semifinals.

Quarterfinal 1

Camargo defeated de Capriles and Horn in a three-way barrage for third place.

Quarterfinal 2

Biancalana and Saucedo defeated de Beaumont in a three-way barrage for second and third place.

Quarterfinal 3

Quarterfinal 4

Quarterfinal 5

Lepage defeated Anen and Nielsen in a three-way barrage for third place.

Quarterfinal 6

Semifinals

The top 5 finishers in each pool advanced to the final.

Semifinal 1

Agostoni defeated Ljungquist in a barrage for fifth place.

Semifinal 2

Final

Zappelli and Mangiarotti finished tied on win–loss record, touches received, and touches scored. Rather than use the head-to-head results from the round-robin (Zappelli had defeated Mangiarotti 3–0 in their bout), they faced each other in a barrage for silver and bronze medals. Zappelli won, 3–0 again.

References

Epee men
Men's events at the 1948 Summer Olympics